Piccoli equivoci (internationally released as Little Misunderstandings) is a 1989 Italian comedy film directed by Ricky Tognazzi. It was shown at the 1989 Cannes Film Festival, in the section "Quinzaine des Réalisateurs".

For this film Nancy Brilli won a David di Donatello for Best Supporting Actress and a Silver Ribbon in the same category.
The director Ricky Tognazzi was instead awarded with a David di Donatello for Best New Director and a Silver Ribbon in the same category.

Cast 
Sergio Castellitto: Paolo
Lina Sastri: Francesca
Roberto Citran: Giuliano
Nancy Brilli: Sophie
Nicola Pistoia: Enrico
Pino Quartullo: Piero

References

External links

1989 films
Commedia all'italiana
Films directed by Ricky Tognazzi
Italian comedy films
1989 comedy films
1980s Italian-language films
1980s Italian films